Eurogames may refer to:

 Eurogame, a type of board game
 EuroGames, an LGBT sporting event in Europe
 Eurogames (game publisher), a French board game publisher operated by Descartes Editeur
 European Games, an international multi-sport event contested by athletes from European nations

See also 
 European Masters Games
 Eurogamer, an English video game news website